Robert H. Snyder (July 13, 1855 – November 17, 1905) was a Democratic politician from Tensas Parish, Louisiana.

Snyder served in the Louisiana House of Representatives for two nonconsecutive terms from 1890 to 1896 and from 1904 until his death in office.

From 1896 to 1900, Snyder was lieutenant governor under Governor Murphy J. Foster, Sr., a favorite of the planter class. During this time, the Louisiana Constitutional Convention of 1898 was held. Snyder was defeated for lieutenant governor in 1900 by future U.S. Representative Albert Estopinal, Sr., of St. Bernard Parish.

Snyder's younger brother, Jefferson B. Snyder, was a native of Tensas Parish and district attorney from 1904 to 1945 in Tallulah in Madison Parish.

Snyder is interred at Natchez City Cemetery in Natchez, Mississippi.

References

1855 births
1905 deaths
Speakers of the Louisiana House of Representatives
Democratic Party members of the Louisiana House of Representatives
Lieutenant Governors of Louisiana
People from St. Joseph, Louisiana
Burials in Mississippi
19th-century American politicians